Horovce is a village and municipality in Michalovce District in the Kosice Region of eastern Slovakia.

History
In historical records the village was first mentioned

Geography
The village lies at an altitude of 111 metres and covers an area of  (2020-06-30/-07-01).

Population 
It has a population of 857 people (2020-12-31).

Ethnicity
The population is about 99% Slovak in ethnicity.

Culture
The village has a small public library, a football pitch and a food store.

Genealogical resources

The records for genealogical research are available at the state archive "Statny Archiv in Presov, Slovakia"

 Roman Catholic church records (births/marriages/deaths): 1790-1895 (parish B)
 Greek Catholic church records (births/marriages/deaths): 1804-1923 (parish B)

See also
 List of municipalities and towns in Slovakia

References

External links
https://web.archive.org/web/20070513023228/http://www.statistics.sk/mosmis/eng/run.html
Surnames of living people in Horovce

Villages and municipalities in Michalovce District
Zemplín (region)